Alistair Lord (born 9 April 1940) is a former Australian rules footballer who played for Geelong during the late 1950s to the mid-1960s.

Lord played as a centreman and debuted in 1959. He won the Brownlow Medal in 1962 comfortably as well as the Carji Greeves Medal, averaging 30 disposals a game for the year. In 1963 he was a member of Geelong's premiership side, playing alongside his twin brother Stewart.

He retired at 26 and returned to the family farm at Cobden. He accepted the position as captain-coach of South Warrnambool in the Hampden League. He often played against his brother, Stewart, who was captain-coach of Camperdown at the time.

Notes

External links
 

1940 births
Australian rules footballers from Victoria (Australia)
Geelong Football Club players
Geelong Football Club Premiership players
Brownlow Medal winners
Carji Greeves Medal winners
Cobden Football Club players
South Warrnambool Football Club players
Living people
Place of birth missing (living people)
Australian twins
Twin sportspeople
Identical twins
People educated at Geelong College
One-time VFL/AFL Premiership players